Pseudovermis hancocki is species of minute sea slug, specifically an aeolid nudibranch, a marine gastropod mollusc or micromollusk in the family Pseudovermidae.

These extremely small sea slugs are meiofauna; they live among sand grains.

References

 Powell A. W. B., New Zealand Mollusca, William Collins Publishers Ltd, Auckland, New Zealand 1979 

Pseudovermidae
Gastropods of New Zealand
Gastropods described in 1969